Djanneley "Bobó" Rompão (born 8 June 1990), sometimes known as just Bobó, is a Santomean footballer who plays as a midfielder for Agrosport and the São Tomé and Príncipe national team.

International career
Rompão made his professional debut with the São Tomé and Príncipe national team in a 2–1 2022 FIFA World Cup qualification loss to Guinea-Bissau on 10 September 2019.

References

External links
 
 

1990 births
Living people
São Tomé and Príncipe footballers
São Tomé and Príncipe international footballers
Association football midfielders